Paratalanta pandalis is a species of moth of the family Crambidae. It is found in the Palearctic including Europe.

The wingspan is 25–29 mm. The forewings are whitish-yellowish, towards costa suffused with pale grey; lines grey, first irregular, second subserrate, sinuate ; orbicular dot and discal mark grey, sometimes obsolete ; a serrate grey subterminal line, limiting a greyish -tinged terminal fascia. Hindwings yellow-whitish; sometimes a grey discal dot ; posterior markings as in forewings. The larva is light pinkish-ochreous to dark grey, tinged with purplish- brown ; dorsal line darker, pale-edged; spots.

The moth flies from June to July depending on the location.

The larvae feed on nettle, Ballota, mint, Origanum vulgare, thyme, Myrica gale, goldenrod and Vicia sepium.

References

External links
 
 waarneming.nl 

Pyraustinae
Moths described in 1825
Moths of Europe
Moths of Asia
Taxa named by Jacob Hübner